Dipterocarpus geniculatus is a species of plant in the family Dipterocarpaceae. The species name is derived from Latin ( = with bent knee) and refers to the shape of the petiole. There are two subspecies; D. geniculatus subsp. geniculatus and D. geniculatus subsp. grandis both of which are endemic to Borneo. Both subspecies are emergent tree, up to 60 m tall, in mixed dipterocarp forest. D. geniculatus subsp. geniculatus is found on leached sandy and sandy/silty clay soils and occurs in at least one protected area (Bako National Park). D. geniculatus subsp. grandis occurs on similar soils as well as those over ultrabasic rock and occurs in at least one protected area (Lambir Hills National Park).

References

geniculatus
Endemic flora of Borneo
Trees of Borneo
Flora of the Borneo lowland rain forests